The Clark Freeport and Special Economic Zone (CFEZ), often shortened to Clark, refers to an area in Central Luzon, Philippines.

The CFEZ in Pampanga covers portions of the cities of Angeles and Mabalacat and portions of the town of Porac while parts of the area in Tarlac include portions of the towns of Capas and Bamban, Tarlac.

The CFEZ divided into two areas, the Clark Freeport Zone (CFZ) and the Clark Special Economic Zone (CSEZ). The New Clark City is part of the Clark Special Economic Zone. The CFZ covers the area of the former United States Air Force facility, Clark Air Base. Most of this air base was converted to Clark International Airport and some remained under the control of the Philippine Air Force. Clark Global City is also part of the Clark Freeport Zone.

Clark forms the hub for business, industry, aviation, education, and tourism in the Philippines as well as a leisure, fitness, entertainment and gaming center of Central Luzon.

History

Establishment of the Clark Special Economic Zone
The Bases Conversion and Development Act of 1992 (Republic Act 7227) authorized the President to issue a decree converting the military reservation in the Clark area covering Angeles City, Mabalacat, and Porac, Pampanga and Capas, Tarlac into a special economic zone. The legislation also created the Bases Conversion and Development Authority (BCDA) to facilitate the conversion process.

President Fidel Ramos issued Proclamation No. 163 on April 3, 1993, creating the Clark Special Economic Zone (CSEZ) and transferring the administration of the area to the BCDA. The proclamation included the Clark Air Base and portions of the Clark reverted baselands not reserved for military use to the CSEZ. The Clark Development Corporation, a subsidiary of BCDA was founded to oversee the development of the area in the same year. The Metro Clark Advisory Council (MCAC) was also formed shortly as a mechanism for the CDC to coordinate with local government units in the area.

The following year, President Ramos declared Clark as the future site of a "premier" civilian international airport with a 14-million passenger capacity by 1998 but this plan did not come to fruition as projected.

On June 14, 1996, the CSEZ was expanded with the addition of the Sacobia area, which includes lands from Mabalacat, Pampanga and Bamban, Tarlac, through Ramos' Proclamation No. 805.

The CSEZ was placed under the Philippine Economic Zone Authority on March 10, 2006 by then President Gloria Macapagal Arroyo through Proclamation 1035 granting tax and duty exemptions to export company locators operating within the CSEZ. The Clark economic zone lost these exemptions in 2005 after a Supreme Court ruling that these exemptions under the BCDA charter are exclusive to the Subic economic zone.

Creation of the Freeport Zone
The Clark Air Base area, also known as the Clark Main Zone was declared a Freeport Zone and was separated from the special economic zone through Republic Act 9400 of 2007.

Since then the Freeport Zone and the Clark Special Economic Zone were considered as separate areas but collectively they are occasionally referred to as the "Clark Freeport and Special Economic Zone".

Further reorganization
In November 2018, the BCDA and the Clark Development Corporation grouped four developments within the CFEZ namely the Clark Freeport Zone, Clark Global City, Clark International Airport, and New Clark City as "districts" under one brand dubbed as "Clark: It Works. Like A Dream".

Areas

Clark Freeport Zone 
Clark Global City
Clark International Airport

Clark Special Economic Zone (CSEZ) 

 New Clark City

See also
 History of Clark Air Base
 Clark Veterans Cemetery

References

External links

 Clark Freeport Zone Website

 
Industrial parks in the Philippines
Free ports
Tarlac
Angeles City
Mabalacat
PEZA Special Economic Zones
1993 establishments in the Philippines